Fanny Parnell born Frances Isabelle Parnell (4 September 1848 – 20 July 1882) was an Irish poet, Irish nationalist, and the sister of Charles Stewart Parnell and Anna Catherine Parnell, important figures in nineteenth century Ireland.

Early life
Fanny Parnell was born on 4 September 1848 in Avondale, County Wicklow, Ireland into a wealthy Protestant background. She was the eighth child out of eleven and fourth daughter born to John Henry Parnell, a landowner and the grandson of the last Chancellor of the Irish Exchequer, and Delia Tudor Stewart Parnell, an Irish-American and the daughter of Admiral Charles Stewart (1778–1869) of the US Navy. Fanny's mother hated British rule in Ireland, a view presented through her children's works. 

Fanny was an intelligent girl and before she was through her teen years she had studied mathematics, chemistry, and astronomy, and she could speak and write fluently in almost all the major European languages. She also had talents in music and painting and drawing in oil and water colours. Fanny's parents separated when she was young, and soon after her father died in July 1859 at the age of forty eight, she and her mother moved to Dalkey. A year later they moved to Dublin.

In 1865 they moved to Paris to join mother Delia Parnell's well off brother. Fanny studied art and wrote poetry. She and her mother were still in Paris when the Franco-Prussian War broke out in 1870 and joined the American Ladies’ Committee. They nursed the wounded, and fund-raised for and set up a hospital, including overseeing the purchasing and storing of supplies.

In 1874 Delia's brother died, and she and Fanny left Paris to return to the family estate in Bordentown, New Jersey in the United States, where Fanny's political career was to begin.

Works

Fanny was known as the Patriot Poet. She showed interest in Irish politics and much of her poetry was about Irish nationalism. While she was living in Dublin in 1864, she began publishing her poetry under the pseudonym "Aleria" in The Irish People, the newspaper of the Fenian Brotherhood. Most of her later work was published in The Boston Pilot, the best known Irish newspaper in America during the nineteenth century. Two of her most widely published works were The Hovels of Ireland, a pamphlet, and Land League Songs, a collection of poems. Her best known poem is "Hold the Harvest", which Michael Davitt referred to as the “Marseillaise of the Irish peasant."

The Hovels of Ireland
The Hovels of Ireland was a twenty seven page pamphlet published in February 1880. Throughout the pamphlet Fanny discusses the injustices of the Irish peasant and expresses her disgust for the Irish land-owning class, which, ironically, is the class she belongs to. In this pamphlet Fanny uses the following quote to explain that even though her family owned land she and her family were Irish nationalists. “That moral energy which inspires men with the ability and the desire to oppose themselves to injustice, to protest against the abuse of power, even when this injustice and this abuse do not directly affect them is the virtue which is the guaranty of order, security and independence.” The pamphlet was widely published in newspapers and journals. The pamphlet was sold for 25 cents each, and the money earned from this was sent to the Famine Fund.

Ladies' Land League
Fanny's brother, Charles, became active in the Land League, an organisation that fought for poor tenant farmers, in 1879 and she strongly supported him. Fanny and her younger sister by four years, Anna Parnell (1852–1911), co-founded the Ladies' Land League in 1880 to raise money in America for the Land League. In 1881 the Ladies' Land League continued the work of the men in the Land League while they were being imprisoned by the British government. In Ireland Anna became the president of the Ladies' Land League, and the women held many protests and quickly became more radical than the men, to the resentment of the male leaders. Fanny stayed in America and worked to raise money for the organisation. Most of the Land League's financial support came from America because of the campaigning done by Fanny.

Death
Fanny died on 20 July 1882, at the young age of 33, of a heart attack at the family mansion in Bordentown, New Jersey. She was buried at the Tudor family plot at Mount Auburn Cemetery in Cambridge, Massachusetts. At the time of her death, Fanny was survived by her mother, three brothers, and four sisters.

References

External links

portrait of Fanny Parnell

1848 births
1882 deaths
Irish activists
Irish women activists
People from County Wicklow
Irish women poets
Burials at Mount Auburn Cemetery
19th-century poets
19th-century Irish women writers
19th-century Irish writers